Alread School District No. 5 was a school district headquartered in Alread, an unincorporated area in Van Buren County, Arkansas.

On July 1, 2004, the Alread district consolidated with the Scotland School District into the existing Clinton School District.

References

Further reading
These include maps of predecessor districts:
 (Download)

External links
 
 Alread School District No. 5, Van Buren County, Arkansas, general purpose financial statements and other reports June 30, 2003

Education in Van Buren County, Arkansas
School districts disestablished in 2004
2004 disestablishments in Arkansas
Defunct school districts in Arkansas